Chibundu Amah is a professional football player for Heartland F.C of Owerri a first tier football club in Nigeria.

Early life 
Amah was born and raised in Umahia, Abia State to Mr & Mrs Chibundu.

Club career

Sunshine United 
Amah became famous for his outstanding performance against Lobi Stars netting a hat trick for the inconsistent Akure based

He became the first player to score a hat trick that season.

2019 - Heartland FC 
Amah Chibundu joined Heartland FC from Sunshine United in an undisclosed fee after a superb season with the Owena Whales.

He opened his scoring account for Heartland FC of Owerri against plateau United. He also scored the lone goal for Heartland against Lobi Star.

Reference 

Nigerian footballers
Heartland F.C. players
Year of birth missing (living people)
Living people
Association football forwards